The Clay People is the third studio album by the Clay People. It was released on May 12, 1998, by Slipdisc Records.

Reception

In his review for The Clay People, Greg Prato of allmusic praised the group embracing a more organic sound that would appeal to heavy metal enthusiasts. Aiding & Abetting gave the album a positive review, saying "Clay People has infused the metal guts with something very alive." Sonic Boom lambasted Kernon's production as being responsible for "turning an excellent Coldwave act into nothing more than a glorified Metal band" but praised Daniel Neet's vocal contributions.

Track listing

Personnel
Adapted from The Clay People liner notes.

Clay People
 Dan Dinsmore – drums, design
 Mike Guzzardi – electric guitar
 Brian McGarvey – electric guitar
 Daniel Neet – lead vocals
 D. Patrick Walsh – bass guitar, design

Production and design
 Wade Alin – programming
 Frank Chackler – executive producer
 Joe Gastwirt – mastering
 Scott Gries – photography
 Neil Kernon – production, recording, mixing
 Jana Leon – cover art, photography
 Dana Schneider – cover art, sculpture

Release history

References

External links 
 The Clay People at Bandcamp
 

1998 albums
The Clay People albums
Albums produced by Neil Kernon